Bratmobile had a BBC live broadcast with John Peel on July 1993 and was issued the following year as The Peel Session CD EP.

Track listing
"There's No Other Way/No You Don't"  – 2:23  	   	
"Bitch Theme"  – 1:45 		
"Make Me Miss America"  – 2:41 		
"Panik"  – 1:43

Album credits
Bratmobile
 Molly Neuman – Drums, background vocals
 Erin Smith – Guitar
 Allison Wolfe – Vocals,
Additional credits
 Adam Askew – Engineer,
 Pat Graham – Photography,
 Paul Long – Producer

References

Bratmobile
Bratmobile albums
1994 EPs
Live EPs
1994 live albums